Artemis P. Simopoulos is an American physician and endocrinologist, who authored several books on diet and nutrition. She is the founder and president of the non-profit educational organization Center for Genetics, Nutrition and Health since 1990 and a founding member of the Study of Fatty Acids and Lipids in 1991. She is a researcher who publishes on diet and health, and organizes conferences on the subject. She is noted for her work on Polyunsaturated fat. She was also the chair of the nutrition coordinating committee of the National Institute of Health for nine years.

Early life and education
Simopoulous was born in Greece in 1933. She has a bachelor of science in chemistry from Barnard College in New York and a doctor of medicine from the Boston University School of Medicine.

References

1933 births
Living people
American endocrinologists
American women nutritionists
American nutritionists
American women physicians
American women writers
American writers of Greek descent
Barnard College alumni
Boston University School of Medicine alumni
Women endocrinologists
21st-century American women